Freeze Frame is a 1992 television film directed by William Bindley.

Plot
Lindsay Scott is an intelligent student who works as a reporter for her high school in suburban Indianapolis. She uncovers a huge economic-espionage conspiracy. She reports to the authorities, but they refuse to believe her. Lindsay and her friends decide to uncover the bad guys themselves and come up with a dangerous plan.

Cast
Shannen Doherty – Lindsay Scott
Robyn Douglass – Victoria Case
Charles Haid – Dr. Michael Scott
Ryan Lambert – Tripp
Adam Carl – Brandon

References

External links

1993 television films
1993 films
American teen films
1992 thriller films
1992 films
American thriller television films
Films set in Indianapolis
1990s English-language films
Films directed by William Bindley
1990s American films